The Moamoria rebellion (1769–1805) was the 18th century uprising in Ahom kingdom of present-day Assam that began as power struggle between the Moamorias (Mataks), the adherents of the Mayamara Sattra, and the Ahom kings.  This uprising spread widely to other sections of Ahom kingdom including disgruntled elements of the Ahom aristocracy leading to two periods in which the Ahom king lost control of the capital. Retaking the capital was accompanied by a massacre of subjects, leading to a steep depopulation of large tracts.  The Ahom king failed to retake the entire kingdom; a portion in the north-east, Bengmara (modern-day Tinsukia district), became known as Matak Rajya ruled by a newly created office called Borsenapati, became a tribute-paying but virtually independent territory. 

These revolts were described in the Ahom Buranjis as Moamaria/Matak troubles, were indeed a lingering civil war that ended indecisively with both the warring camps totally exhausted and ruined. The break down of Ahom land revenue and militia system were visible during the reign of Rajeswar Singha, through census of population was taken from time to time a large section of people always managed to avoid the registration. Because of multiple leakages, paik mobilization in full strength proved to be difficult. 

The Ahom kingdom emerged from the rebellion much weakened.  About one half of the population of the kingdom perished and the economy was totally destroyed.  The weakened Ahom kingdom fell to a Burmese invasion which ultimately led to colonization by the British.

Background

This rebellion was primarily among the Moamoria Paiks against the Ahom kingdom. The Moamorias were the followers of the Moamaria sattra that was predominantly Morans (the mainstay of the Ahom militia), but there were also the Sonowal Kacharis (gold-washers), Chutias (expert archers and matchlockmen), professional castes such as Hiras (potters), Tantis (weavers), Kaibartas (fishermen), Bania (artisans) and Ahom nobles and officers. The rising popularity of Moamoria sattra had siphoned off the power of orthodox Hindu groups and Shakti sect which supported the Ahom kings. The sattras provided refuge for those seeking to escape the Paik system under which, any able-bodied person who was not a Brahmin or a noble could be used for labour, services or conscripted into the army. The Ahom kingdom was entering a crisis, as the Paik system on which the state was based was unable to adapt to the changing economy and the emerging social classes.  The rise of the sattras was one of the reason for the leakage of manpower from the Paik system, and as a result the Ahom kingdom and the sattras came into increasing conflict.  Moamara sattra belonged to the non-conformist Kala-samhati sect that competed against the royalist sattras belonging to other sects.  The Ahom kingdom watched the growth of this sattra with discomfort and heaped insult and repression on the followers of this sattra. The Moamoria Rebellion started during the reign of Swargadeo Lakshmi Singha and ended during the reign of Swargadeo Kamaleswar Singha. It continued up to 36 years, from 1769 to 1805.

In the course of time, the Moamoria guru compromised with the Ahom rulers and the rebels drew inspiration from magico-religious cult of night worshipers, a mixture of tribal fertility rites and Tantrism.

Development and Growth of Mayamara Satra
The Mayamara Satra was founded by Aniruddha Bhuyan popularly called as Aniruddhadeva, a relative of Srimanta Sankardev, towards the beginning of the 17th century. The Satra was a member of Kala Sanghati sect of Neo-Vaisnavism, one of the four Samathis or sects of Satras. Gopaldev, a disciple of Srimanta Sankardev founded the Kala Samathi sect. Gopaldev propagated the teaching of Neo-Vaisnavism among the tribals of Upper Assam. It particularly gained popularity and favor among the tribal people for its egalitarian and humanitarian outlook. The Kala samathi sect had  12 main Satras, six of them presided by Brahmanas and six of them by Shudras heads, called Gosains or Mahantas. Among the 12 Satras, the Mayamara and Dihing   were the most influential and notable. The humanitarian outlook of Kala Samathi was best seen in these former, both of these Satras freely and openly admitted converts from the backward or depressed classes of the society and placed them on equal footing with even the high Hindu castes. In this sect the Vedic rituals were reduced to negligible positions.

The Moamarias were very orthodox in their reverence to their Guru, the Guru occupied the same position as the Guru in Sikhism, and very strict in observing the rites of their sect. The Mahanta also occupied the place of the virtual sovereign. He was the binding link of his disciples amongst themselves were unique. To quote Surya Kumar Bhuyan: "There was never a tribe called Moamariya, but their unification for the purpose of resistance to the Ahom government was so complete that they appeared to have possessed all the characteristics of a regular tribal organization."

The disciples of Mayamara Satra were called Moamarias but they belonged to separate tribes and communities, like the Moran, Chutias, Kacharis, Bihias, Ahoms, Kaibarta and  Brittials as well as caste-Hindus like the Brahmanas, Kayastha and Kalitas. The disciples were scattered over the whole country as far as Goalpara. The traders and cultivators disciples of the Satra greatly contributed to the material prosperity. The Mahanta was virtually a feudal lord, which the Ahom monarch saw as a rival for sovereignty.

The Morans were the most prominent Moamariya disciples, along with the Chutias and Kachari who formed the pillars of Ahom Army. These former tribes were also employed in various royal departments and establishments. The exaction of this tribes became more exploitive when king Rajeswar Singha reduced the unit of a got paiks from 4 to 3.As the Satra rose into prominence, it aroused the jealousy and suspicion of the Ahom monarchy.

Ahom-Satras conflict
Srimanta Sankardeva established the Mahapuruxiya Dharma in the 16th century, a proselytizing religion that opened itself to all including the Muslims and tribesmen.  The religion provided opportunities for social and economic improvements to common tribesmen, and the sattras provided a safe haven from mandatory labor under the Paik system.
The Ahom rulers saw a threat and Sankardeva himself had to escape to the Koch kingdom during the reign of Suklenmung to avoid persecution.  A later king, Pratap Singha, demolished the Kalabari and Kuruabahi sattras and his successors followed a similar policy of oppression.  Jayadhwaj Singha reversed this policy and his successors up to Sulikphaa Lora Roja tried to come to terms with the sattras.  This policy was again reversed during the reign of Gadadhar Singha, who began persecuting the sattras.  His son, Rudra Singha tried to isolate the more liberal—and thus most threatening to the Ahom state—of the non-Brahmin sattras by encouraging the Brahmin sattras.  When he realized this policy was not bearing fruit, he initiated a policy to accord state support to saktism, the historical and theological bete noire of the Mahapuruxiya dharma, to contain further sattra influence.  This led to more persecutions, the most notable under Bar Raja Phuleshwari during the reign of Siva Singha. This unresolved conflict finally exploded into the Moamoria rebellion in the 18th century that so weakened the Ahom kingdom that it collapsed in the 19th century.

Development and Objectives

The main object of the Moamarias was to reform the existing government, who had developed a new social outlook through the teaching of the Neo-Vaisnavite movement. The rebellion was greatly delayed by the Ahom–Mughal conflicts that almost covered the whole period of 17th century.  Once after the external danger was over, the early Tungkhungia Ahom kings  (1681–1838) turned their attention to the internal problems of the kingdom and became aware of the changing outlook of their subjects. Instead of gearing the political system to the interest of the people, monarchs like Gadadhar Singha and Siva Singha even denied the right of the people to worship.Rudra Singha even sanctioned laws of human inequality,  which debarred the Shudra Mahantas from initiating Brahmins at the Synod of Garhgoan in 1702.

The people, at this no longer could compromise themselves with the existing monarchy with their new ideas of equality and fraternity  with its judicial policy involving torture and death even to the innocent along with the guilty of political offenses, its bureaucratic administrative structure with powers concentrated at hands of hereditary nobles, its exacting of compulsory manual labour from the people, both systematically and rigidly, and all other anomalies with the passage of time, circulated an inevitable rebellion and it culminated in the Moamaria rebellion.

Following the Moamaria rebellion, the people in different parts of the kingdom raised their own standards under their own respective leaders creating widespread confusion, which at last could be only stopped through foreign intervention. The policy of blood and iron, which the monarchy resorted to, with the view of suppressing the rebellion, ultimately proved to be more disastrous to its own existence. The ever-increasing number of individuals who were only resisting the exaction of compulsory labour by the government privately, now reacted violently and got organised against the king, succeeding in creating wide-mass uprisings, in freeing themselves from the prevailing forms of exploitation, which marked the beginning of a new stage of Assam yet only to be thwarted by foreign interventions in upcoming years.

First phase 
On September 15, 1769, Ragha Neog and Nahar Khara, both disciples of Mayamara Satra, were mercilessly beaten and the ears were cut off the former, on the orders of Kirti Chandra Borbarua, for alleged charge of bringing him a lean elephant. When the followers of Nahar took both of them under heavy bandages to their Guru Astabhuj at Khutiapota, finally gave sanction to take arms against the Ahom government and also allowed his son Gagini Deka Mahanta to join them.

Gagini Deka Mahanta or the Deka Satradhikar of Mayamara Satra, was previously on several occasions severely abused by Kirti Chandra Barbarua. The Barbarua went to the extent of inventing stories, attacking on the moral character of the Mahanta. Kirti Chandra Borbarua instigated king Lakshmi Singha to return the monthy nirmali prasad sent by the Mahanta, as considering it from an unholy person. This was much tolerated by the Deka Mahanta, he had also discussed the plans of revenge with the Goanburhas with the view of exterminating Kirti Chandra Borbarua and occupying the Ahom throne. Deka Mahanta for this purpose had measured the strength of the followers of Satra which came out to be more than 8 lakhs, but was delayed by Mahanta Abtahujdeva who dissuaded his son and the Goanburhas from putting themselves in such dangerous affairs on the plea that ''better opportunities were bound to come sooner or later.''

Rebellion 
The Moamarias raised their banner of rebellion towards the close of October, 1769. When men were sent by the Borbarua to procure timber from Moran area, the local people there led by wives of Naharkora Saikia, Bhatuki and Bhabuli, who assumed the name of Radha and Rukmini respectively, denied the entry of men sent by Borbarua and declared that they were independent under their own king, and not under authority of the king and Borbarua. Lakshmi Singha sent a small contingent of 2,000 men under the command of Bez Tekela Bora, considering it a minor uprising. But the army sustained a serious defeat at the hands of rebels with loss of vast quantity of provisions. Tekela Bora himself made a hairbreadth escape, and informed the king about the seriousness of the situation. He further informed the king about the supernatural powers possessed by the two female leaders, by whom they were able to catch bullets with their wrappers. 

Meanwhile the rebels, another division of 7,000 strong, under the command of Ragha, pitched their camp on the bank of Secha, south of Dihing and a strong advance guard was stationed at Namrup. The inhabitants of those areas extended their full support to the rebellion.

The rebels led by Ragh Neog,  Naharkhora Saikia and his two wives Radha and Rukmini, promised the throne to three Ahom princes Mohanmala Gohain third son of Rudra Singha, and Charu Singha and Ratneswar, sons of Rajeswar Singha,  that in case they won. This had caused great confusion in the royalist camps for these princes, as desired by the rebels. Specially, Mohanmala  was a extremely popular prince, and his banishment was considered a injustice,  and with their help liberated the territory north of the Burhidihing river.

Flight 
Considering the situation, king Lakshmi Singha summoned a meeting with the nobles to discuss the measures to the taken against the rebels. While few nobles who could realize the serious nature of the rebellion and therefore to be quelled by peace overtures, the others like Kirti Chandra Borbarua, overconfident of success suggested of pursuance of arms, underestimating the strength of the rebels. Accordingly, under the command of Harnath Senapati Phukan an army of 14,000 was despatched. However, after many strains, they were defeated by the rebels. Harnath was arrested and put on confinement, and his soldiers immediately surrendered to Moamarias after the fall of their commander. This news distressed the king, and sent orders to Dashrath Bahikhowa Borphukan of Guwahati to recruit soldiers from the vassal states, as they were not supposed to have any sympathy towards the rebels. Accordingly men were sent to Manipuri king Jai Singh seeking for help. Meanwhile, the defeat of royalist soldiers at several engagements created panic in their camp. The espionage system of Ahoms also became inoperative, the Moamariya disciples serving as attendants of Barbarua, revealed all the war-plans of royalist camp.

Meanwhile the Moamarias crossed Charaideo hill, and made their way to Garhgaon and in no time occupied it and started their march towards the Ahom capital Rangpur. king Lakshmi Singha sent the Guwahati detachment which had just reached Rangpur under the Dihingia Phukan, but the force was completely routed by Moamarias. After this, the situation became extremely critical, and having no way out, the king left the capital on the night of 21 November, 1769 accompanied by Kirti Chandra Borbarua, Bhagi Burhagohain, Duara Borphukan and a number of leading nobles. While they were on their way to Guwahati, they were compelled to halt on the bank of Sonai river.  Meanwhile a group of 400 rebels pursued the king and captured him and the nobles while they were discussing their further course of action against the Moamarias.

Moamaria regime and Restoration 
On November 21, 1769 the rebels occupied the Ahom capital and placed Ramananda, son of Naharkhora, on the throne.  The Ahom king, Lakshmi Singha, was captured and kept a prisoner.  All high officers were executed and three common Mataks became the three great Gohains.  Ragh Neog became the Borbarua, a kanri paik became the Borphukan and two common Ahoms became the Gohains at Sadiya and Marangi.

The rebels, inexperienced in statecraft, failed to usher in a new order.  Instead, they began imitating the unpopular practices of their erstwhile leaders.  Ragh Neog seized the wives and daughters of many nobles and kept them in his harem.  As some of the rebel officers took on the airs of the old nobility, many rebels were dissatisfied and, led by Govinda Gaoburha, left the capital and reached Sagunmuri.  Taking advantage of this, some of the old nobility killed Ragh on April 14, 1770 with the help of Kuranganayani, an Ahom queen from Manipur, and retook the capital. In the purge that followed, Ramananda the rebel king, Naharkhora, Radha, Rukmini, Astabhujdev, the Moamara sattradhikar and his son Saptabhuj were all executed.

After the capital was recaptured the remaining rebel forces in Sagunmuri under Govinda Gaoburha attempted to overthrow the king again. This movement too had the signs of a popular uprising.  The main weapons used by the rebels were bamboo staves and clubs, and their slogan was praja-oi joroiroa, chekani-oi sopai dhora ("Ye oppressed subjects, hold your stave close"), and this uprising was called chekani kubua ron ("The war of the staves").  In one of the engagements, the Borpatrogohain and the Dhekial Phukan were killed, and the Borgohain made a hair breath escape.  The rebels advanced toward Rangpur and they were met at Thowra by the forces of the Burhagohain, the new Borpatrogohain, the Borgohain and a detachment cavalry from the Manipur king.  In this battle the rebels were defeated; Govinda Gaoburha was captured and executed,

Some rebels then retreated deep into jungles and continued guerilla warfare under leaders like Lephera, Parmananda and others.  An initial royalist force under the Na-Phukan and the Deka-Phukan was defeated, but a later force under the Borpatrogohain was able to eliminate Lephera and Parmananda.  Subsequently, the Burhagohain began systematically destroying the villages and killing the remaining leaders; in a siege many rebels and their families died of starvation.  The remaining people were then separated and settled at different places.  One of the last holdouts, Nomal, was finally captured and executed.  This ended the first phase of the Moamoria rebellion.

Second phase
King Lakshmi Singha died of dysentery in 1780, he was succeeded by his only son Gaurinath Singha. The Moamarias couldn't be suppressed even after ruthless persecution, only it enhanced the flames of revenge and rebellion from the minds of the people. The dissatisfaction and discontentment spread to those areas also where the influence of Mayamra Satra was only peripheral. The Moamarias solidified themselves and were waiting for an opportune moment to renew their struggle. The peasant of Rangpur, Garhgaon and the areas adjacent began to organise themselves secretly under the veil of religious assemblies and Naam-Kirtan. Towards, 1782 many secret organizations appeared in different parts of Upper Assam, and coordination among these organizations was established. As they were less in number, they planned to do a surprise attack.

Burning of Coronation hall 

The Moamarias got this opportunity to renew their struggle in April 1782, when the king had just finished the celebration of his coronation ceremony at Garhgaon, the insurgents entered the place campus in disguise of king's attendants, and set fire to the coronation hall and attempted to burn the city. In the confusion of darkness, the Moamarias even believed that the king had been slain, but he managed to escape to Rangpur. The Moamarias then proceeded towards Rangpur but couldn't enter the city due to stubborn resistance offered by Ghanashyam Burhagohain and Harnath Senapati Phukan. Due to the course of the engagement, large numbers of Moamarias perished, and the rest fled in all directions. Then the king, on being advised by the nobles, rejecting any conciliatory approach to win them over,  promulgated a wholescale massacre, an order that the Moamarias should be killed without discrimination. The massacre continued for a month and a half, in which several thousands of Moamarias were killed. A recent head of Mayamara Satra had estimated that 700,000 Moamarias had perished by the sword of royalists during those six weeks of terror.

This step only aggravated the situation. The Mahanta of Jakhalabandha Satra organized a movement at Jaysagar but he was captured, and his eyeballs were plucked and three of his followers were fired in oil to death. The Morans of the extreme east under one Badal Goan Burha (village headmen) started a rebellion but were quelled easily

Rebellion 
In 1782 Purnanada Burhagohain became the Burhagohain after the death of his father, Ghanashyam who was the Rajmantri or prime minister. At his instance, the Moamarias were finally permitted to have a new guru, who were without a preceptor since 1770, when both the Mahanta and his son Deka-Mahanta were executed under royal orders. Accordingly, Pitamberdeva, a member of the last Mahanta's line was appointed as the guru in 1785. Pitamberdeva prior to this was staying as a fugitive in Daphla Hills with his many disciples. During that period Piramberdeva was propagating his faith among the Dafla-Bahatiyas. As a result of this, the Dafla Bahatiyas and the Moamarias living at the foot of Dafala hills combined under the leadership of a weaver named Harihar Tanti.

In 1786 Harihar Tanti raised an army of Moamarias and Dafla-Bahatiyas. After having defeated the royalist forces at Garaimari bil and other places. Pitamberdeva joined the rebels, who was persuaded by them, after performing the Brahmayagna or Brahmana slaying sacrifice. The rebels burnt the Garmur Satra whose head was one Brahmana. Soon afterward the troops sent by the vassal chiefs of Beni, Luki, and Beltala were defeated. 

The Moamarias now advanced towards Ahom capital Rangpur. The remnants of the royalist forces joined the Burhagohain who was at Sonari. Purnanada Burhagohain was defeated by the Moamarias at Sagunmuri, and retreated to Gaurisagar. Moamarias destroyed Garhgaon which came under the occupation of Moamarias . The Burhagohain joined Gaurinath Singha who was at  Rangpur Palace. The Moamarias started pillaging the villages near Rangpur, the Mahanta of Dihing Satra tried to repulse them with his disciples. The Ahom priest too collected a band of soldiers and fought the rebels. Like this, the Mahantas of Auniati and Dakhinpat offered help to the royalist but all these efforts went in vain or with minimal success. Gaurinath Singha in the meantime sent Katakis (messengers) seeking help from the Borphukan and the rulers of Cachar, Jayantia, and Manipur. But before any response could reach him, the Moamarias advancing along the Janji river appeared at the gate of capital 

The Moamarias encircled Rangpur. On January 19, 1788, panic-stricken Gaurinath Singha along with his most nobles, and the inhabitants of the capital fled. The Burhagohain was left in the capital as in charge of the affairs in Rangpur. Purnananda Burhagohain also retreated after gallantly defending the city for a few days. 

The Burhagohain along with the Borbarua and other loyalist leaders tried to recover Rangpur, but with minimal success. The Burhagohain marched down with the view of recruiting soldiers from those areas. Purnananda Burhagohain met Pani Phukan in the Kaziranga river with a force of 30,000 sent by the king from Guwahati. With this reinforcement, he assumed offensive to recapture Rangpur. Purnananda erected a line of forts, which further repulsed the advance of Moamarias. At this time, one Pat Konwar, the youngest son of Rajeswar Singha along with the help of some exiled princes organized a large force and came forward to assist the Burhagohain, he also procured the strength of 8,000 soldiers from the Nara Raja. Pat Konwar with this force, occupied Rangpur for some time in August 1788. But the rebels soon gained victory and put him to death.

In February 1789, the Burhagohain managed to gain some success with the help of further reinforcement, but in end was forced to retreat to Gaurisagar. At Gaurisagar provisions ran short, many died of starvation and dysentery and the strength of the army was greatly reduced. At which he retreated to Dichai. From Dicahi, Purnanada Burhagohain operated his further advance to the Moamarias. The Moamarias used to harass the inhabitants by committing ravages, pillages, and rapine of the tracts under the control of Burhagohain. During this period, the people gradually lost heart and would gladly have accepted the Moamaria supremacy but for the untiring efforts of the Burhagohain. He recruited troops from different parts of the country, trained them, and sent them to fight, by luring them by giving presents or by the threat of inflicting punishment. The Mahantas of Brahmana Satras deserted their monasteries (Satras) due to outgoing panic and instability. During this period, owing to the prolonged confusion and disorder, cultivation suffered severely, and many died of starvation. While on the other hand, the Moamarias inspired people from different parts of the country to fight against the Ahom government. As a result, the Khel system was rapidly breaking up and it became difficult for the government to recruit soldiers through the traditional methods.

The captured region was locally administered by the Moamarias with Harihar Tanti on the north bank of the Brahmaputra, Howha ruling Majuli, Sarbananada Singha ruling the Moran tracts from Bengmara (present-day Tinsukia), he was acknowledged as the Raja by the Hatisungi Morans, Godha was his Borbarua. Bharath Singha was set up as the king in Rangpur and Sukura was appointed as his Borbarua. Coins were also issued in the names of Sarbananda and Bharath.  Territory up to Ladaigarh was kept immune from the advances of Moamarias by Purnanada Burhagohain. He erected a rampart around his fort, called Bibudhi Garh or perplexing rampart by the Moamarias which extended from Kaliani hill to the foot of Naga hills, he used to operate from behind it. 

Inspired by the rebellion of Moamarias the people of different parts of the country rose to opposition against the Ahom government. In Darrag a rebellion broke out and assumed a popular form, this was supported by the Kamrupis who also were dissatisfied with the Ahoms. Gaurinath Singha at last finally resorted for external help to quell off the disturbances. He had Medhi Borphukan write a letter to the Company resident in Goalpara, Hugh Baille, seeking military assistance. Baille in response sent some Barkandazes, but they were intercepted by Krishnanarayan, the rebel Koch prince of Darrang. Gaurinath Singha then wrote to Daniel Raush, who sent him a contingent of Barkandazes. When the Barkandazes reached Gaurinath Singha he left Guwahati for Nowgong under their escort. Gaurinath Singha sent the Barkandazes to assist the Burhagohain when he got news of the discomfiture of his army at Meleng, and left a small party for his protection. However, the Barkandazes were not effective in the help of Burhagohain. In 1790, the Raja of Manipur came to offer military assistance, still grateful of the services rendered by Rajeswar Singha in 1765. 

In Nowgong, where Gaurinath Singha was staying, the locals of that place had to supply food provisions and other articles to the king and his numerous camp followers. The royal officers there indulged themselves in the looting of food and property, molestation of women and etc. This had caused bitter dissension among the Nagayans and had ultimately roused them to take action. They under the leadership of Sidhura Hazarika captured the king's camp on February 1791, and demanded the king to either depart from that place or replace all his officers. 

The counterattacks began around 1792 when Bharat repulsed an attack from the Manipuri king. In 1792, Thomas Welsh of the East India Company came to the aid with 550 well-trained and well-armed troops. He occupied Guwahati on November 24, 1792, without any resistance, and on March 18, 1794, restored Rangpur to Gaurinath Singha.  Captain Welsh departed from Assam after having carried huge quantities of articles, besides 2,000 boats and 4,000 guns. Thomas Welsh returned to Bengal on May 25, 1794. Immediately after the re-occupation of Rangpur, the capital was shifted to Jorhat as now Rangpur seemed very vulnerable against the Moamaria attack.

Aftermath of second Moamaria rebellion
Rangpur was captured again by the Moamarias after the departure of Captain Welsh. The Barkandazes renewed their depredations at Darrang and Kamrup. Meanwhile, Sivadatta Chetia Borphukan in alliance with Helimeli Solal Gohain and Haradatta Choudary, with the help of Barkandzes, placed a boy of 13 years, son of one Bapi Gohain as the Raja of Guwahati. The Barphukan committed several offenses in Guwahati, with the help of Barkandazes in his hand. He in order to have supreme control over the Assam-Bengal trade, he set aside the king's nominee Krishnaram Gosain and appointed Rudram as Duria Barua in Kandadhar Chouki. Chetia Borphukan had also executed many officers at Guwahati. The loyalist, under the leadership of Jati Rajkhowa, fed up with the despotic activities of Borphukan, refused to accept the new Raja, and procured the arrest of the Borphukan by one Hazari Singh. Sivadatta Chetia was thus sent to Jorhat where he was executed, Hemeli Solal Gohain shared the same faith, and thus Jati Rajkhowa became the Borphukan. But Haradatta managed to escape to Bhutan.

Meanwhile, Jati was replaced as the Borphukan in favor of Badan Chandra , by Hazari Singh who began to dictate the affairs at Guwahati, Badan Chandra bid to give sixty thousand rupees and paid the amount by robbing the temples. The King could only recover from the grip of Hazari Singh by importing another Barkandaz leader. 

king Gaurinath Singha, still adhering to the policy of blood and iron, had dismissed all the officers appointed by Captain Welsh and replaced them with his own nominee. He inflicted severe punishment on all those who participated in the rebellion with great brutalities. At this time the Khamtis, carved out a small principality around Sadiya by announcing independence.

Third phase

Creation of Standing army 
Seeing the highly organized and effective manners of a standing army, greatly impressed by the discipline and organization of the Company army, and finding it difficult to recruit soldiers through Kheldars, Purnanada Burhagohain took initiative to create a standing army in that manner of Company. Purnanada Burhagohain managed to retain two Hindustani sepoys by offering heavy bribes, belonging to the detachment of Captain Welsh. Those two Hindustani sepoys, named Dina and Fakirchand, were employed in training the Assamese recruits in the standards of Company troops. The new standing army consisting of 18 companies of 100 sepoys each, were given uniforms and armed with flint locks purchased in Calcutta, and were stationed at both Guwahati and Garhgoan. One Chandra Gohain, related to the Burhagohain was made the Captain of the army. Now with this organized army, Burhagohain could quell the Moamarias and all such rebellions.

Accession of Kamaleswar Singha 
Gaurinath Singha died in August 1795, leaving behind no male heir. Purnanada Burhagohain installed Kinaram, son of Kadam Dighala Gohain, who was the grandson of Rudra Singha brother Namrupia Raja Lechai, on the throne. Kinaram was given the Hindu name of Kamaleswar Singha and Ahom name of Sukinglingpha, on his accession. And with this, Purnanada Burhagohain became the de facto ruler of the country. 

The nomination of Kamaleshwar Singha on the throne was an unpopular one. It is believed that Lechai Namrupia Raja, who was the forefathers of Kamaleswar Singha, all of his descendants were debarred from exercising the throne by Rudra Singha for having rebelled against him. Beside there was a question of Auyursut Gohain legitimacy, father of Kadam Dighala Gohain. According to Buchanon Hamilton, there was also another ground for the unpopularity of Kamaleswar Singha, as he and his forefathers were disciples of the Shudra Mahanta of Sologuri, whereas the five monarchs preceding him had Brahmanas as their guru. Purnananda expected to get the support of other Shudra Mahantas, by elevating a prince who had Shudra Mahanata as his  guru. Besides Sologuri Satra was a branch of Dihing Satra that had hence rivalry with Mayamara Satra, he thus expected to encourage an alliance among those Shudra Mahantas, who were friendly with the Dihing and Sologuri Satras and use them against the Moamarias.

Fresh Moamaria uprising
The Moamarias renewed their rebellion against the government, they got in alliance with the neighboring hill tribes such as Singphos and Khamtis. The Dafla-bahatiyas now also raised a fresh rebellion under the leadership of One Phopai. They even manage to procure the service of the Barkandazes, who began troubling the border villages in the kingdom. This happened in 1796. The rebels following this crossed to south bank near Silghat in present-day Nagaon district, but were overtaken by the royalist commanded by Purnananda. Then the Burhagohain advanced toward the north bank and arrested all the rebel leaders including the Mayamara Mahanta Pitambardeva. The rebel leaders and his commanders were killed and the Mayamara Mahanta was starved to death, where he was sent into confinement at Jorhat.

Soon after this, the Moamarias of Bengmara under the leadership of Bharat Singha raised another rebellion, but in the encounter that followed, Bharat Singha was killed at which his followers dispersed. In 1801, there again rose a rebellion in league with Singphos, but were subdued.

The Moamaria fugitives in Cachar managed to get the support of Kacharis and started their rebellious activities. They set up an Ahom prince Bijoy Barmura Gohain as their king, a grandson of Rajeswar Singha. In the meantime, Purnanada Burhagohain urged the Kachari king Krishna Chandra to send back the fugitives but the Kachari king refused. Following this, the Burhagohain sent a force under the command of Bhandari Borbarua to take the fugitives by force (1803). In the encounter that followed, the rebels commanded by Bijoy Barmura were overpowered, however, Bijay Barmura managed to escape and instead an imposter was killed. The rebels renewed their activities again in 1805, and this time appointed Brajanath son of Barmura as their king. In the following engagement, the strengthened rebels could gain victory over the royalist force and compelled the latter to retreat. Purnananda Burhagohain, sent a fresh contingent to renew the conflict. In the following battle that ensued at the mouth of Kalang river, the royalist force gained a decisive victory. The Kachari king meanwhile, entered into negotiations with the Ahom government and agreed to send back the Moamaria fugitives (1805).

The Moamairas at Bengmara under their chief Sarbananda Singha made fresh attempts of hostilities but sustained a serious defeat. At this, the Moamarias sent one Ramnath Barbarua to invoke the Burmese. Earlier on two occasions, the Moamarias made attempts to invoke the aid of the Burmese but were each time bribed off by the Burhagohain, who was determined to prevent foreign interventions in the kingdom.

End
Purnanada Burhagohain realized the critical situation, and unless the Moamarias were concialated, the grave danger would befall on the Ahom monarchy and thus the Burhagohain entered into an agreement with the Moamaria chief of Bengmara, Sarbananda Singha, by which the territories between the Brahmaputra and the Burhi Dihing were ceded on an autonomous basis and recognized his title 'Barsenapati' and this territory was to be called as Matak rajya or Matak Kingdom. Sarbananda in turn agreed to pay annual tribute. Henceforth, the Moamarias ceased to give any more trouble to the Ahom government.

Aftermath 
The long series of uprisings totally devastated the country and severely weakened the Ahom dynasty, Moamaria rebellion may be described as the first socio-political movement in the history of Assam. It shook the foundations of the Ahom monarchy. Following the deposition of Lakshmi Singha and the installation of a commoner it shattered the divinity associated with kinship. More and more subject population, whose rights were been suppressed by the government got organised and raised their own banners of rebellion. The rebellion started on a religious pretext, but was never a crusade between the Vaishnavas and the Saktas or between the Mayamara Satra and other Satras. The monarchy which was Sakta by creed, was supported by number of Vaisnava Satras, even that of Dihing, a member itself of Kal-Samathi, to which the Mayamara Satra itself belonged. Also, there were not just disciples of Mayamara Satra in the rebel camps. Many Ahom nobles and princes themselves either participated in the rebellion or extended their support to it. For the royalist, it was the battle of Dharma (justice) against Adharma (injustice). Concluding from all this Baruah (1985) states: The Moamariya rebellion was a rebellion of the people against the existing government and those who disfavoured a change in it joined with the hands with the royalist...

The rebellion could only effectively hit the Paik system, its social and economic foundations remained unchanged. The rebels never got politically organized under a single leader, nor were the leading the rebellion, strong enough to command, wheares others lacked the qualities of a leader. 

The Moamaria rebellion dislocated the economic life in Assam. The population of the country was reduced to one-half. Cultivation suffered, and the life of common people became miserable. Security of life and property was lost. While after the rebellion, the Ahom government could just stand with the hands of Purnanada Burhagohain.

In popular culture 
 The first Assamese language novel Bhanumati written in 1890 by Padmanath Gohain Baruah, it's background is based upon the Moamaria Rebellion.

Notes

References

 
 
 
 

 

 

Ahom kingdom
1770s in India
1780s in India
1790s in India
1800s in India
Rebellions in India
Conflicts in 1769
1770s conflicts
1780s conflicts
1790s conflicts
1800s conflicts